Mount Aylmer is a mountain in Banff National Park, Canada. At , it is the highest point of the Palliser Range and the entire East Banff Ranges of the Canadian Rockies. The mountain was named in 1890 by J.J. McArthur after his hometown of Aylmer, Quebec.

The summit can be climbed via scrambling. Anyone who reaches the summit is rewarded with not only a great view of Lake Minnewanka but also a summit registry box.  Names collected in this box are entered into the archives of the Whyte Museum in Banff.

See also 
 List of mountains in the Canadian Rockies

References 

Mountains of Banff National Park
Three-thousanders of Alberta